The  is the National Olympic Committee in Japan for the Olympic Games movement, based in Tokyo, Japan. It is a non-profit organisation that selects teams and raises funds to send Japanese competitors to Olympic events organised by the International Olympic Committee (IOC).

The Japanese Olympic Committee has helped organise every bid for an Olympic Games by a Japanese city to date. Japan has held the Olympic Games four times: the Summer Olympics twice (1964 Summer Olympic Games and the 2020 Summer Olympics, both in Tokyo) and the Winter Olympics twice (the 1972 Winter Olympics in Sapporo and the 1998 Winter Olympic Games in Nagano).

Presidents

Executive committee
The committee of the JOC is represented by:
President: Yasuhiro Yamashita
Vice Presidents: Eisuke Hiraoka, Yasuo Saito
Secretary General: Eisuke Hiraoka
Senior Members:  Kiichiro Matsumaru, Kohzo Tashima, Tsuyoshi Fukui, Tetsuro Hibino
Members: Yuko Arakida, Masatoshi Ito, Koji Ueno, Shin-ichiro Otsuka, Mitsugi Ogata, Takahiro Kitano, Akira Kokaze, Mikako Kotani, Haruka Saito, Noriyuki Sakamoto, Yuji Takada, Naoko Takahashi, Mitsuo Tsukahara, Hiroo Nobata, Yosuke Fujiwara, Ichiro Hoshino, Kazufumi Minami, Keisuke Muratsu, Koji Murofushi, Kaori Yamaguchi
Auditors: Mitsutaka Kurokawa, Shigemitsu Sakuma, Toshihisa Nagur

Notable former members
Tsutomu Kawabuchi: member of the IIHF Hall of Fame

Member federations
Japan National Federations are the organizations that coordinate all aspects of their individual sports. They are responsible for training, competition and development of their sports. There are currently 34 Olympic Summer and 6 Winter Sport Federations in Japan.

See also
Japan at the Olympics
Onishi Tetsunosuke
Japan Paralympic Committee

References

External links
 

National Olympic Committees
Organizations based in Tokyo
Sports organizations established in 1911
Olympic Committee
1911 establishments in Japan